Will Viharo is an East Bay/Seattle-based author who has published nine novels.  Seven of his novels are neo-noir (or neo-pulp ) works which blend elements of surrealism, gore, violent sex, and horror.

His body of writing includes the Vic Valentine series (Love Stories Are Too Violent For Me, Fate Is My Pimp/Romance Takes A Raincheck, and I Lost My Heart In Hollywood/Diary of a Dick), Lavender Blonde, and Down A Dark Alley. Love Stories Are Too Violent For Me, originally published by Wild Card Press in 1993, was republished in August 2013 by Gutter Press, in anticipation of the movie adaption, which Christian Slater will direct and star in.

Viharo, who was born in New York City on April 2, 1963, has also written two supernatural horror works: A Mermaid Drowns in the Midnight Lounge and Freaks That Carry Your Luggage Up To Your Room.

From 1997 to 2012, Viharo, under the name Will the Thrill, regularly hosted Thrillville, a series of B-movie showings, with his wife Monica "the Tiki Goddess" Cortes Viharo.  The locations of these stagings included the Parkway Speakeasy Theater in Oakland, California, which closed in 2009; the Cerrito Theater in El Cerrito, California (now operating under different management); and the Roxie Theater in San Francisco.

Viharo's parents named him after William Shakespeare.  His mother is a former beauty queen, and his father, Robert Viharo, a B-movie actor.

In April 2014, Viharo and his wife, Monica Cortes Viharo - a college professor - moved from Alameda, California to Seattle, Washington.

On July 24, 2015, Viharo's The Space Needler's Intergalactic Bar Guide, an erotic science fiction book co-authored with Scott Fulks, was published.

In a March 2014 interview, Viharo stated that he was working on short stories - "an unusual form" for him - and would soon be finishing his sixth Vic Valentine novel, then (publicly) untitled. On November 29, 2015, that novel (titled Hard-Boiled Heart) was published.

Just prior this period, actor Christian Slater—who had begun in earnest to adapt Love Stories Are Too Violent For Me for the silver screen—was side-tracked by the success of his first-season television show Mr. Robot.

Works
 Chumpy Walnut (a fable "about a foot-tall boy lost in a world of macabre make-believe" that Viharo wrote when he was sixteen years old)
 Love Stories Are Too Violent For Me (first "Vic Valentine" novel, published in 1993 and republished in 2013)
 Down A Dark Alley (a sex-and-violence crime spree novel, published on March 4, 2011)
 Lavender Blonde (a dialogue-structured novel)
 A Mermaid Drowns in the Midnight Lounge (an erotic supernatural horror novel)
 Fate Is My Pimp/Romance Takes A Raincheck (second and third "Vic Valentine" books - novellas, published in one volume, on April 15, 2011)
 I Lost My Heart In Hollywood/Diary of a Dick (fourth and fifth "Vic Valentine" books - novellas, published in one volume, on April 23, 2011)
 Freaks That Carry Your Luggage Up To Your Room (an erotic supernatural horror novella, published on October 11, 2011)
 It Came From Hangar 18 (an erotic science fiction work, co-authored with Scott Fulks, published on February 3, 2012)
"Behind the Bar" (story), from the 2014 anthology Long Distance Drunks: A Tribute to Charles Bukowski, edited by Max Booth III
"People Bug Me" (story), published in the fifth issue of Nightmare Illustrated magazine in April 2014
"Short and Choppy" (story), published in the Vol. 1 Issue 1/Fall 2014 issue of Dark Corners in October 2014 (Editors: CT McNeely, Emily J. McNeely and Steve Gallagher)
"The Lost Sock" (story), published in the Vol. 1 Issue 2/Winter 2014 issue of Dark Corners in December 2014 (Editors: CT McNeely, Emily J. McNeely and Steve Gallagher)
"Cool Reception" (story), published in the Vol. 1 Issue 4/Summer 2015 issue of Dark Corners in July 2015 (Editors: CT McNeely, Emily J. McNeely and Steve Gallagher)
 The Space Needler's Intergalactic Bar Guide (an erotic science fiction novel, co-authored with Scott Fulks, published on July 24, 2015)
 Hard-Boiled Heart (sixth "Vic Valentine" novel, published on November 29, 2015)

References

External links
 Viharo's personal website

Living people
1963 births
Writers from Seattle
American male novelists
20th-century American novelists
21st-century American novelists
American male short story writers
20th-century American short story writers
21st-century American short story writers
20th-century American male writers
21st-century American male writers
Novelists from Washington (state)